is a Japanese basketball player for Haneda Vickies and the Japanese national team. and at the 2020 Summer Olympics, winning a silver medal.

Career 
She graduated from Waseda University.

She participated at the 2018 FIBA Women's Basketball World Cup.

References

1993 births
Living people
Basketball players at the 2020 Summer Olympics
Japanese women's basketball players
Olympic basketball players of Japan
Point guards
Olympic medalists in basketball
Olympic silver medalists for Japan
Medalists at the 2020 Summer Olympics
21st-century Japanese women